Antal Páger may refer to:

Antal Páger (actor) (1899–1986), Hungarian actor
Antal Páger (canoeist), Hungarian canoer